The dean of Harvard Law School is the head of Harvard Law School. The current dean is John F. Manning—the 13th person to hold the post—who succeeded Martha Minow in 2017.

List of deans of Harvard Law School

Founded in 1817, Harvard Law School is the oldest continuously operating law school in the United States. Since its founding, 13 people have officially served as dean.

Acting deans
Several individuals have also served as acting dean at one time or another. They are: Samuel Williston (1909–10), Austin Wakeman Scott (1915–16), Edward Henry Warren (1921–22), Joseph Warren (1925–26 and 1929), Joseph Henry Beale (1929–30), Edmund Morris Morgan (1936–37, 1942–45), Robert Amory, Jr. (1948), Livingston Hall (1959), Andrew James Casner (1967–68), and Patricia Ann Lovett (2009).

See also
Law school dean

References

External links
https://web.archive.org/web/20150906053618/http://hls.harvard.edu/library/historical-special-collections/research-assistance/deans-of-harvard-law-school/